The arrondissement of Pointe-à-Pitre is an arrondissement of France in the Guadeloupe department in the Guadeloupe region. It has 14 communes.

Composition

The communes of the arrondissement of Pointe-à-Pitre, and their INSEE codes, are:

 Les Abymes (97101)
 Anse-Bertrand (97102)
 Capesterre-de-Marie-Galante (97108)
 La Désirade (97110)
 Le Gosier (97113)
 Grand-Bourg (97112)
 Morne-à-l'Eau (97116)
 Le Moule (97117)
 Petit-Canal (97119)
 Pointe-à-Pitre (97120)
 Port-Louis (97122)
 Sainte-Anne (97128)
 Saint-François (97125)
 Saint-Louis (97126)

History

The arrondissement of Pointe-à-Pitre was established in 1947.

As a result of the reorganisation of the cantons of France which came into effect in 2015, the borders of the cantons are no longer related to the borders of the arrondissements. The cantons of the arrondissement of Pointe-à-Pitre were, as of January 2015:

 Les Abymes-1
 Les Abymes-2
 Les Abymes-3
 Les Abymes-4
 Les Abymes-5
 Anse-Bertrand
 Capesterre-de-Marie-Galante
 La Désirade
 Le Gosier-1
 Le Gosier-2
 Grand-Bourg
 Morne-à-l'Eau-1
 Morne-à-l'Eau-2
 Le Moule-1
 Le Moule-2
 Petit-Canal
 Pointe-à-Pitre-1
 Pointe-à-Pitre-2
 Pointe-à-Pitre-3
 Sainte-Anne-1
 Sainte-Anne-2
 Saint-François
 Saint-Louis

References

Pointe-a-Pitre